In astronomy, an iron star is a hypothetical type of compact star.

Unrelatedly, the term "iron star" is also used for blue supergiants which have a forest of forbidden FeII lines in their spectra. They are potentially quiescent hot luminous blue variables.  Eta Carinae has been described as a prototypical example.

Formation

An iron star is a hypothetical type of compact star that could occur in the universe in the extremely far future, after perhaps 101500 years.

The premise behind the formation of iron stars states that cold fusion occurring via quantum tunnelling would cause the light nuclei in ordinary matter to fuse into iron-56 nuclei. Fission and alpha-particle emission would then make heavy nuclei decay into iron, converting stellar-mass objects to cold spheres of iron. The formation of these stars is only a possibility if protons do not decay. Though the surface of a neutron star may be iron according to some predictions, it is distinct from an iron star.

By the end of 101026 to 101076 years, iron stars would have collapsed into neutron stars and black holes.

In popular culture
 The Soviet film The Andromeda Nebula is about a starship low on fuel caught by an iron star's gravity, with the star itself being so dim that it can only be seen in the infrared. It is based on the novel Andromeda Nebula by Ivan Yefremov written when steady state theory was dominant and iron stars were expected to exist in the Milky Way.

See also
 Future of an expanding universe
 Hypothetical star
 Heat death of the universe

References 

Star types
Hypothetical stars
Star
Ultimate fate of the universe